Shin Yu-bin (born 5 July 2004) is a South Korean table tennis player.

Career

2019 
She competed in the 2019 ITTF World Tour Grand Finals in the mixed doubles event with Cho Dae-seong. They were knocked out in the quarterfinals by Xu Xin and Liu Shiwen, 0–3. She also participated in the 2019 Asian Table Tennis Championships in both the women's singles and the mixed doubles, winning against the much higher ranked Cheng I-ching in the round of 32, 3–2, but lost to Feng Tianwei in the round of 16, 0–3 in the women's singles. In the mixed doubles, she competed with Cho Dae-seong. They were knocked out in the quarterfinals by Wang Chuqin and Sun Yingsha, 1–3.
Also in 2019, she won the mixed doubles with Cho Dae-seong in the Czech Open, becoming the youngest person to win a mixed doubles title in the ITTF World Tour at 15 years, 50 days. They won against Jun Mizutani and Mima Ito in the finals, 3–2.

2021 
Shin was named to the South Korean Olympic team on 4 February 2021. She will be 17 at the Tokyo Olympics in the summer of 2021, making her the youngest ever Korean Olympic table tennis player, breaking a record previously held by Ryu Seung-min.

In March 2021, Shin played in WTT Doha. She lost to eventual semi-finalist Miyuu Kihara in the round of 32 in the first WTT Contender event, but she beat Miyuu Kihara in their second match-up in the round of 64 of the WTT Star Contender. Shin then upset Margaryta Pesotska in the round of 32. In a potential preview for the Tokyo Olympics, Shin upset Miu Hirano in the round of 16 in an aggressive and dominant win.

Singles titles

References

External links
 

2004 births
Living people
South Korean female table tennis players
Table tennis players at the 2020 Summer Olympics
Olympic table tennis players of South Korea
People from Suwon
Sportspeople from Gyeonggi Province
21st-century South Korean women